The 2017 ACC women's soccer tournament was the postseason women's soccer tournament for the Atlantic Coast Conference. The defending champions were the Florida State Seminoles, but they were eliminated from the 2017 tournament with a 2–1 quarterfinal loss at North Carolina. North Carolina won the tournament with a 1–0 win over Duke in the final. The title was the 21st for the North Carolina women's soccer program, all of which have come under the direction of head coach Anson Dorrance.

Qualification 

The top eight teams in the Atlantic Coast Conference earned a berth into the ACC Tournament. The quarterfinal round was held at campus sites, while the semifinals and final took place at MUSC Health Stadium in Charleston, SC. Six of the eight teams in the tournament were ranked in the United Soccer Coaches poll prior to the beginning of the tournament.

Bracket

Schedule

Quarterfinals

Semifinals

Final

Statistics

Goalscorers 
3 goals
 Tziarra King – NC State

2 goals
 Zoe Redei – North Carolina

1 goal

 Chelsea Burns – Duke
 Rachel Cox – NC State
 Imani Dorsey – Duke
 Dallas Dorosy – Florida State
 Bayley Feist – Wake Forest
 Sabrina Flores – Notre Dame
 Carly Leipzig – Boston College
 Meghan McCool – Virginia
 Kayla McCoy – Duke
 Taylor Otto – North Carolina
 Alessia Russo – North Carolina
 Ella Stevens – Duke
 Taryn Torres – Virginia

All Tournament Team

See also 
 Atlantic Coast Conference
 2017 Atlantic Coast Conference women's soccer season
 2017 NCAA Division I women's soccer season
 2017 NCAA Division I Women's Soccer Tournament
 2017 ACC Men's Soccer Tournament

References 

ACC Women's Soccer Tournament
2017 Atlantic Coast Conference women's soccer season